Corymbia deserticola is a species of straggly tree, a mallee or a shrub that is native to Western Australia and the Northern Territory. It has rough, tessellated bark on the trunk and branches, mostly sessile, heart-shaped leaves arranged in opposite pairs, flower buds in groups of seven on each branch of a peduncle, creamy yellow flowers and urn-shaped to shortened spherical fruit.

Description
It has thick, rough, flaky, deeply fissured, brownish bark on the trunk and branches.

Taxonomy and naming
This eucalypt was first formally described in 1987 by Denis Carr and Maisie Carr and given the name Eucalyptus deserticola but the name was not valid. That name was validated by publication in 1988 in the Flora of Australia. In 1995 Ken Hill and Lawrie Johnson changed the name to Corymbia deserticola in the journal Telopea. The specific epithet (deserticola) is derived from the Latin desertum meaning "desert" and -cola meaning "-dweller".

In the same journal, Hill and Johnson described two subspecies and the names are accepted by the Australian Plant Census:
 Corymbia deserticola (D.J.Carr & S.G.M.Carr) K.D.Hill & L.A.S.Johnson subsp. deserticola;
 Corymbia deserticola subsp. mesogeotica K.D.Hill & L.A.S.Johnson that has larger, more rounded adult leaves and larger fruit with longer pedicels than the autonym. The epithet is from ancient Greek meaning "inland", referring to the distribution of this subspecies.

Distribution and habitat
Subspecies deserticola grows in arid, stony or sandy sites, sometimes on mountaintops, and occurs from Mount Augustus and the Hamersley Range in Western Australia to Tennant Creek and the Barkly Tableland in the Northern Territory. Subspecies mesogeotica grows in red sand, has a more inland distribution and occurs from the Gibson Desert to the Barkly Tableland.

Conservation status
Both subspecies of C. deserticola are classified as "not threatened" by the Western Australian Government Department of Parks and Wildlife.

See also
 List of Corymbia species

References

deserticola
Myrtales of Australia
Rosids of Western Australia
Plants described in 1988
Taxa named by Maisie Carr